This is a list of characters from , a 2016–17 Japanese tokusatsu drama written by Yuya Takahashi, and the 27th entry in the Kamen Rider franchise. The series centers on a conflict between humans and Bugsters, a form of computer virus that infects humans playing Genm Corporation (Genm Corp.) video games. Genm Corp. and the Ministry of Health counter the threat by developing Gamer Drivers and Rider Gashats for doctors to save their patients from the Bugster Viruses.

Main characters

Emu Hojo
Emu is well-meaning and friendly, but also clumsy and absent-minded, which often gets him into trouble with nurses. As the series progresses, however, he matures and becomes less naive, picks up Kiriya Kujo's lying habit, and becomes a master manipulator comparable to Kuroto and Masamune Dan.

Sixteen years prior to the series, the antisocial Emu had found solace in designing game characters. After sending his concepts to Genm Corp. game designer, Kuroto, Emu received a prototype game that infected him with and turned him into patient zero for the Bugster Virus. As a result, an alternate persona called Parad manifested from Emu's desire for a playmate and assumed control, leading to the latter becoming "M" and being kidnapped by Next Genome scientists who had sought to extract the Bugster Virus for Kuroto. However, Parad had turned into a Bugster and separated himself from Emu, allowing the latter to pursue his desire to become a doctor and earn an internship at Seito University Hospital. Despite being separated from Parad, trace amounts of the Bugster's data causes Emu to maintain his gamer persona, become a Kamen Rider, and later grant him the ability to create Gashats from his imagination. After being recruited by CR, Emu has several encounters with Parad, discovers what had happened to him, and joins forces with Parad and other Gamer Riders to defeat the Bugsters and Masamune.

Utilizing the Gamer Driver in conjunction with the platform game-themed  Gashat, Emu can transform into Kamen Rider Ex-Aid  Level 1. In this form, he gains increased agility and can transform further into Action Gamer Level 2. Additionally, activating Mighty Action X generates a  digital field and several  medals with unique power-ups randomly hidden inside chocolate block-like containers that he can use for increased traversal capability. Moreover, he can combine Mighty Action X with additional Gashats to achieve stronger forms, which are as follows:
: A form accessed from Mighty Action X and the beat 'em up-themed  Gashat that equips him with the  gauntlet.
: A form accessed from Mighty Action X and the multiplayer game-themed  Gashat along with one to three other Gamer Riders that equips him with the  headgear and the extendable .
: A stronger variant form that equips him with the Drago Knight Blade and Gun along with his original weapons.
Sports Action Gamer Level 3: A form accessed from Mighty Action X and Kuroto's Shakariki Sports Gashat that arms him with the Trick Flywheels.
: A form accessed from Mighty Action X and the cooking video game-themed  Gashat that equips him with the roller skate-like  sabatons and the arm-mounted  and  condiment bottles.
: A form accessed from Mighty Action X and the Pac-Man-themed  Gashat that equips him with the  gauntlets. This form appears exclusively in the web-exclusive special Kamen Rider Genm: Legend Gamer Stage.
: A hybrid form accessed from Mighty Action X and the  Gashat that grants superhuman speed, and arms him with the Front and Rear Armed Units. This form appears exclusively in the Kamen Rider Lazer Hyper Battle DVD.

Additionally, Emu can achieve the following forms by utilizing unique Gashats in place of Mighty Action X:
 and : A chibi-like form and its subsequent sleeker upgrade, both of which are accessed from the double-sized co-op game-themed  Gashat. The latter form splits him into the azure-colored Double Action Gamer Level XX L, which represents Emu's level-headed doctor personality who prioritizes his patient's safety, and the orange-colored Double Action Gamer Level XX R, which represents Emu and Parad's hot-blooded gamer personality who prioritizes defeating his opponent and ensuring victory in battle. Emu's Double Action Gamer Level XX form first appears in the film Kamen Rider Heisei Generations: Dr. Pac-Man vs. Ex-Aid & Ghost with Legend Rider.
: A mecha-like form accessed from the double-sized mecha simulation game-themed  Gashat that automatically transforms him into his Action Gamer Level 2 form and grants the use of the  armored suit capable of flying and extending its limbs, which Emu can separate from and leave on autopilot while maintaining his Level 99 power, the ability to rewrite a Bugster's coding, depower most Gamer Riders, and heal Game Disease victims.
: A form accessed from the Maximum Mighty X Gashat and the cheat cartridge-like  Gashat that grants warping capabilities, immunity to negative status effects, and a  function that renders him and his allies immune to Masamune's Reset ability.
 Level 1 and 2: A chibi-like form and its subsequent sleeker upgrade, both of which are accessed from the  Gashat that arms him with Kamen Rider Ghost's Gan Gun Saber. These forms appear exclusively in the film Kamen Rider Heisei Generations: Dr. Pac-Man vs. Ex-Aid & Ghost with Legend Rider and the web-exclusive special Kamen Rider Genm: Legend Rider Stage.
 Level 2: A form accessed from the  Gashat that arms him with Kamen Rider Drive's Handle-Ken. This form appears exclusively in the web-exclusive special Kamen Rider Genm: Legend Rider Stage.
 Level 2: A form accessed from the  Gashat that arms him with Kamen Rider Gaim's Daidaimaru. This form appears exclusively in the web-exclusive special Kamen Rider Genm: Legend Rider Stage.
: A form accessed from the sequel-themed  Gashat alongside Parad that grants increased offensive capabilities. These forms appear exclusively in the Kamen Rider Para-DX Hyper Battle DVD.
: A form accessed from the virtual reality-themed  Gashat that grants the ability to create weapons, obstacles, and traps. This form appears exclusively in the film Kamen Rider Ex-Aid the Movie: True Ending.
: A form accessed from the visual novel-themed Mighty Novel X Gashat that grants invincibility and reality alteration. This form appears exclusively in the sequel novel Kamen Rider Ex-Aid: Mighty Novel X.

During the events of the film Kamen Rider × Super Sentai: Ultra Super Hero Taisen, Emu temporarily assumes the form of the red-colored , a hybrid of Akarenger and the Double Riders. In this form, he can command the Variblune aircraft.

Hiiro Kagami
 is a genius surgeon who recently returned from America, is described as a tsundere, and displays a liking for sweets due to his late girlfriend, Saki Momose. A prodigy in the medical field, Hiiro is initially passive-aggressive towards Emu Hojo due to their differing beliefs. However, the former slowly grows to respect the intern over time, even adopting some of his beliefs. Despite appearing callous, Hiiro does care for others.
 	
During the first Zero Day incident, Momose was infected with the Bugster Virus, but she had kept it secret from Hiiro due to his aloof attitude until he eventually learned what had happened when Graphite manifested from her. When Taiga Hanaya fails to defeat the Bugster, Momose dies and Hiiro develops a grudge against Hanaya and Graphite despite harboring guilty feelings for himself. With Emu's help, Hiiro eventually accepts that he had partially contributed to Momose's death and reconciles with him. Amidst the Kamen Rider Chronicle crisis, Hiiro discovers Momose is among the Bugster Virus-infected victims whose life forces are stored in the Proto-Gashats and is blackmailed into joining Masamune Dan, who threatens to delete her data unless Hiiro serves him. After remembering Momose's last words however, Hiiro rejoins CR to defeat Masamune, guide new interns, and make peace with his past.

During the events of the V-Cinema, Kamen Rider Ex-Aid Trilogy: Another Ending, Hiiro reconciles with Hanaya before joining forces with him to defeat Lovrica, who had brainwashed a temporarily resurrected Momose. Before she dies once more, Hiiro comes to terms with her first death.

Utilizing the Gamer Driver in conjunction with the role-playing game-themed  Gashat, Hiiro can transform into   Level 1. Additionally, activating Taddle Quest generates a Game Area and Energy Items randomly hidden inside treasure chest-like containers. Moreover, he can combine Taddle Quest with additional Gashats to achieve stronger forms, which are as follows:
: A form accessed from Taddle Quest and the rhythm game-themed  Gashat that equips him with the right arm-mounted  phonograph and the left shoulder-mounted  speaker. To compensate for his lack of experience in rhythm games, he incorporates CPR techniques into his attacks.
: A form accessed from the Taddle Quest and Drago Knight Hunter Z Gashats alongside one to three other Gamer Riders that equips him with the right arm-mounted  electromagnetic sword.
  Level 5 (Full Dragon): A stronger variant form that equips him with the Horn Drago Helm, the Whip Drago Tail, and the Drago Knight Gun along with the Drago Knight Blade.
: A form accessed from Taddle Quest and the Family Stadium-themed  Gashat that equips him with the  baseball glove and the left shoulder-mounted  pitching machine. This form appears exclusively in the web-exclusive special Kamen Rider Genm: Legend Gamer Stage.
: A form accessed from Taddle Quest and the hunting simulation game-themed  Gashat that equips him with the right arm-mounted  sword and the left arm-mounted  cannon. This form appears exclusively in the web-exclusive special Kamen Rider Brave: Survive! The Revived Beast Rider Squad.
: A form accessed from Taddle Quest and the  Gashat that equips him with the chest-mounted  laser cannon. This form appears exclusively in the film Kamen Rider × Super Sentai: Ultra Super Hero Taisen.

Additionally, Hiiro can achieve the following forms by utilizing unique Gashats in place of Taddle Quest:
: A form accessed from the tactical role-playing game-themed  side of the double-sized  that grants telekinesis, levitation capabilities, portal generation, creation of magical sword projections, and the ability to nullify Energy Items' effects.
: A form accessed from Another Hiiro's Taddle Legacy Gashat that grants health recovery capabilities, which can be used on himself or allies, and the ability to create energy arrows. His finishers in this form are enhanced versions of his original Critical Strike and Finish finishers, which increase in power if one of his allies are defeated in battle.

Poppy Pipopapo
 is a Bugster based on a video game character from the fictional rhythm game DoReMiFa Beat who is able to assume a human guise called , works as a nurse for CR, and as a navigator for the Gamer Riders. She was born from Kuroto Dan's mother, who had helped him during his youth before he infected her with the Bugster Virus in an attempt to save her from an unknown regular illness.

Following Kuroto's first death, Pipopapo falls under Lovrica's sway and helps him and Parad complete the Kamen Rider Chronicle Gashat before serving as the Kamen Rider Chronicle crisis' referee and navigator. After Masamune kills Lovrica, Emu Hojo saves her from the latter's brainwashing. Wishing to redeem herself, Pipopapo revives Kuroto as a Bugster to help the Gamer Riders defeat Masamune. While she later sacrifices herself to do so, Kuroto uses a fragment of her data to restore her.

As a Bugster, Pipopapo is able to turn cutlery into energy weapons, utilize Energy Items' powers, and enter a level selected by the Kamen Riders. While transformed, she can wield the Gashacon Bugvisor II, possesses immunity against conventional attacks, and perform the  finisher.

Taiga Hanaya
Five years prior to the series, while working for the Seito University Hospital's radiology department, he had been chosen by CR to become a Kamen Rider after detecting the Bugster Virus in one of his patients. He initially refused due to his many responsibilities until his partner, made an attempt to take his place and suffered grievous injuries due in part to not being immunized against the Bugster Virus. Hanaya begrudgingly accepted CR's offer, but failed to defeat the Bugster, Graphite, and save his patient, Saki Momose. After leaving CR and having his medical license revoked, he opened an illegal medical practice in an abandoned hospital and trained to protect himself from the side effects of becoming a Gamer Rider.

In the present, he receives Rider equipment from Kuroto Dan with the intention of taking the other Gamer Riders' equipment and the burden of being a Rider for himself. While Hanaya gradually comes to accept his fellow Riders, he also grapples with his guilt and shame for failing to save Momose. Because of this, he deliberately attempts to antagonize Momose's boyfriend, Hiiro Kagami, believing he deserves the latter's scorn, though the two eventually reconcile. Prior to and during the Kamen Rider Chronicle crisis, Hanaya reluctantly takes on Nico Saiba as an apprentice and works with the Gamer Riders to stop its mastermind, Masamune Dan. Following this, Hanaya regains his medical license and opens a hospital to treat the Bugster Virus.

Utilizing a Gamer Driver in conjunction with the shooter game-themed  Gashat, Hanaya can transform into   Level 1. In this form, he can turn himself into an energy bullet and transform further into Shooting Gamer Level 2. Additionally, activating Bang Bang Shooting generates a Game Area and Energy Items randomly hidden inside drum-like containers. Moreover, he can combine Bang Bang Shooting with additional Gashats to achieve stronger forms, which are as follows:
: A form accessed from Bang Bang Shooting and the shoot 'em up-themed  Gashat that equips him with the  jetpack and the twin  rotary guns.
: A form accessed from the Bang Bang Shooting and Drago Knight Hunter Z Gashats along with one to three other Gamer Riders that equips him with the left arm-mounted  electromagnetic cannon.
: A stronger variant form that equips him with the Horn Drago Helm, the Whip Drago Tail, and the Drago Knight Blade along with the Drago Knight Gun.
: A form accessed from Bang Bang Shooting and the  Gashat that equips him with the  jetpack and the twin  rotary guns. This form appears exclusively in the web-exclusive special Kamen Rider Genm: Legend Gamer Stage.

Additionally, Hanaya can achieve the following forms by utilizing unique Gashats in place of Bang Bang Shooting:
: A form accessed from the naval simulation game-themed  side of the Gashat Gear Dual β that grants increased shooting accuracy as well as equip him with the twin arm-mounted  and the twin shoulder-mounted  turrets.
 : Hanaya's original Rider form accessed from the beta test-themed  Gashat, which he discontinued use of after its negative side effects nearly killed him.

Amidst the Kamen Rider Chronicle crisis, Hanaya acquires two Kamen Rider Chronicle Gashats and uses them in conjunction with the Gamer Driver to transform into Kamen Rider Cronus. While his incomplete Bugster Virus antibodies prevent him from accessing Cronus' full power, Hanaya instead gains access to his teammates' Gashacon Weapons. In the V-Cinema, Kamen Rider Ex-Aid Trilogy: Another Ending, he acquires Poppy Pipopapo's Buggle Driver II and uses it with the Kamen Rider Chronicle Master Gashat in order to properly access Cronus' full power.

Kuroto Dan
 is the cold-blooded, manipulative, and narcissistic CEO and founder of the  game company and son of previous CEO Masamune who believes his intelligence is something to be feared. Despite himself, Kuroto puts on a calm and polite front in public and select individuals he requires for his plans. Having created games for Masamune as a teenager and believing only he was capable of making great games, Kuroto develops a grudge against a young Emu Hojo, who had submitted game ideas that the former perceived as better than his. After becoming one of the first people to discover the Bugster Virus 16 years prior to the series, he infects Emu with it and studies him over the course of a decade before extracting the virus and using it to create the Bugsters. However, Kuroto's mother Sakurako also became infected with the Bugster Virus while helping him and died, leading to him losing his sanity, causing Zero Day via , and framing Masamune for it five years prior to the series.

Upon manipulating the Gamer Riders into "clearing" 10 Gashats' data, Kuroto allows Emu to give him a "game over" so the former can use the death data to create the Dangerous Zombie Gashat before killing Kiriya Kujo for nearly exposing his identity. Despite this, Kuroto's machinations are revealed and he becomes a fugitive, stealing the Riders' Gashats along the way until Emu defeats Kuroto and Parad kills him.

When the Bugsters take over Gemn Corp. and attempt to use Kamen Rider Chronicle to replace humanity with more of their kind, Poppy Pipopapo discovers she was born from Sakurako, who had hidden a Gamer Driver and the Proto Mighty Action X Origin Gashat as a failsafe, and uses the equipment to revive Kuroto as a Bugster with 99 lives. With his new lease on life, he christens himself  and joins forces with the Gamer Riders to exact revenge on Parad, revive Kujo as a Bugster as well, and stop the Bugsters, with Pipopapo using Sakurako's memories to keep him in line. In the process, Kuroto discovers Masamune had manipulated him from the beginning and helps CR develop the Hyper Muteki Gashat so Emu can defeat Masamune and the Doctor Mighty XX Gashat to cure Bugster Virus victims and weaken Kamen Rider Chronicles final boss, Gamedeus, losing a majority of his lives in the process.

During the events of the V-Cinema, Kamen Rider Ex-Aid Trilogy: Another Ending, Kuroto uses his last life to initiate a universal apocalypse through a multiplayer survival horror game called . While he is ultimately defeated by Kujo, Kuroto regains his sanity before disappearing.

During the events of the web-exclusive series, Kamen Sentai Gorider, which takes place before Kuroto's revival as a Bugster, a backup of him disguises himself as Kazuma Kenzaki to lure deceased Kamen Riders Kujo, Kaoru Kino, Kaito Kumon, and Yoko Minato into a Game World and use their despair to resurrect himself. However, Emu, the fallen Riders, and the real Kenzaki foil him via the Goriders's power.

During the events of the two-part web-exclusive special Kamen Rider Genms: The Presidents, which takes place after the series, an artificial intelligence called the Ark digitally revives Kuroto, who infects Gai Amatsu with a unique strain of the Bugster Virus in order to materialize himself in the physical world and regain control of Gemn Corp. so he can use it for malicious means. While a revived Masamune interrupts Kuroto's plans, Amatsu convinces the Dans to reconcile before the father-and-son pair return to the digital world. Despite this, Kuroto vows to return.

During the events of the web-exclusive special Kamen Rider Genms: Smart Brain and the 1000% Crisis, Kuroto is revived as a Humagear and manipulates Amatsu into transferring control of the latter's company, Thouser-Intellion, to him under the Ark's orders.

As of the web-exclusive series Kamen Rider Outsiders, he created a new company, .

Utilizing a Gamer Driver and the beta test-themed  Gashat, Kuroto can transform into Kamen Rider Gemn Action Gamer Level 1. In this form, he gains increased agility and can transform further into Action Gamer Level 2. Additionally, activating Proto Mighty Action X generates a Game Area and several Energy Items randomly hidden inside chocolate block-like containers. Moreover, he can combine Proto Mighty Action X with additional Gashats to achieve stronger forms, which are as follows:
: A form accessed from Proto Mighty Action X and the sports game-themed  that arms him with the twin  throwing discs. This Gashat first appears in the penultimate episode of Kamen Rider Ghost.

While transformed, he can command zombie-themed Bugster Viruses created upon Dangerous Zombies activation, regenerate from injuries, circumvent death, and wield the Gashacon Bugvisor, though he can also wield Gashacon Weapons so long as he has the corresponding Gashats. Using this form, he allows the other Riders to defeat him in order to absorb more death data and evolve his Rider form into  until Emu uses Maximum Mighty X to remove most of his power.

After being revived as a Bugster, Kuroto uses a Gamer Driver in conjunction with the alpha build-themed  to transform into Kamen Rider Gemn Action Gamer . While transformed, he can utilize his extra lives, nullify the Bugster Virus' effects, weaken Gamer Riders, and wields the Gashacon Bugvisor II and Gashacon Breaker. Moreover, he can combine Proto Mighty Action X Origin with additional Gashats to achieve stronger forms, which are as follows:
: A form accessed from the Proto Mighty Action X Origin and Dangerous Zombie Gashats that grants increased power compared to his original Zombie Gamer form due to the former Gashat negating the latter's negative side effects.
: A form accessed from the Proto Mighty Action X Origin and Proto Shakariki Sports Gashats that arms him with the Trick Flywheels. This form appears exclusively in the Kamen Rider Lazer Hyper Battle DVD.

Additionally, Kuroto can achieve the following forms by utilizing unique Gashats in place of his regular Gashats:
 Level 1 and 2: A chibi-like form and its subsequent sleeker upgrade, both of which are accessed from the  Gashat that arms him with Kamen Rider Wizard's WizarSwordGun. These forms appear exclusively in the web-exclusive special Kamen Rider Genm: Legend Rider Stage.
: A mecha-like form accessed from the double-sized mecha simulation game-themed  Gashat that automatically transforms him into his Action Gamer Level 0 form and grants the use of the  armored suit capable of flying and extending its limbs, which Kuroto can separate from and leave on autopilot while maintaining his Level 1000000000 power, celestial body manipulation, immunity to Kamen Rider Cronus' chronokinetic abilities, the ability to summon a horde of his Zombie Gamer form capable of turning people into zombie Bugster Viruses, and acidic breath. This form appears exclusively in the V-Cinema Kamen Rider Ex-Aid Trilogy: Another Ending.
: A form accessed from the  Gashat and absorbing the Ark's data on malice. This form appears exclusively in the web-exclusive special Kamen Rider Genms: Smart Brain and the 1000% Crisis.

Iwanaga's portrayal of Kuroto throughout the series, especially after his character's descent to insanity and eventual revival as a comical maniac, proved highly popular among audiences.

Parad
 is a leading Bugster and the first to manifest after Kuroto Dan infected Emu Hojo 16 years prior to the series. Unlike the other Bugsters, Parad lacks a monstrous form and is the physical manifestation of Emu's childhood desire for a playmate. As such, the former enjoys fighting his host, though he is also protective of his kind and hateful of humanity's pride. While he was a part of Emu's body, Parad dominated his "Genius Gamer M" persona and helped him enjoy popularity as a gamer.

Five years prior to the series however, Kuroto tasked the Next Genome Institute with extracting the Bugster Virus in Emu's body for his plans. As a result, Parad manifested to protect Emu, with the resulting separation causing the latter to pursue his dream of becoming a doctor while maintaining aspects of his gamer personality due to traces of Parad still being in him.

In the present, Parad joins forces with Kuroto to help him complete the Kamen Rider Chronicle project while occasionally helping Emu. After using Kuroto to become , Parad eventually abandons and kills him to take over Kamen Rider Chronicle to help the Bugsters eliminate humanity. During this time, Parad re-possesses Emu to obtain a DNA sample to upgrade his Rider powers and force Emu to fight the other Riders until a revived Kuroto defeats the Bugster while seeking revenge. When Masamune Dan reveals he had manipulated everyone involved in Kamen Rider Chronicle and kills one of his fellow Bugsters, Parad becomes fearful of suffering the same fate and confronts Emu, who defeats and reabsorbs him. Acknowledging his fear of death and feeling remorse over his actions, Parad works with Emu to stop Masamune. While he sacrifices himself in order to do so, a fragment of him remained in Emu's body, which he later uses to revive Parad.

In addition to the standard Bugster abilities, Parad possesses the ability to teleport and project force fields. Being Emu's Bugster, Parad can also assume control of the right half of the former's Double Action Gamer Level XX form.

Utilizing the double-sized , which generates a Game Area with several exposed Energy Items, and the  strap, Parad can transform into Kamen Rider Para-DX . Due to the Gashat Gear Dual's nature, he can assume one of two forms, which are as follows:
: Parad's blue-colored primary form accessed from the puzzle game-themed  side of the Gashat Gear Dual that grants the ability to manipulate numerous Energy Items and combine their abilities for himself as well as generate puzzle piece-like energy shields.
: Parad's red-colored secondary form accessed from the fighting game-themed  side of the Gashat Gear Dual that grants pyrokinesis and superhuman strength as well as equip him with the  gauntlets.

After claiming Kuroto's Gamer Driver, Parad uses it in conjunction with the Gashat Gear Dual to transform into the hybrid game-themed Kamen Rider Para-DX . While transformed, he can utilize and combine both of his Level 50 forms' powers. With the Mighty Brothers XX Gashat, Parad can temporarily split into his Level 50 forms.

During the events of the Kamen Rider Para-DX Hyper Battle DVD, Parad and Emu utilize the Knock Out Fighter 2 Gashat in conjunction with their Gamer Drivers to transform into Kamen Riders Para-DX and Ex-Aid Double Fighter Gamer Level 39.

Kiriya Kujo
 is a cunning medical examiner who investigates the Bugsters and their origins out of curiosity and after losing his friend  during Zero Day. In pursuit of his goal, The former discovers Kuroto Dan is Kamen Rider Gemn and reveals his identity to the other Riders, but is eventually killed for it. Prior to this, Kujo left research for a cure to the Bugster Virus with his colleague, Yoshitaka, who later gives it to Kujo's allies.

During the events of the web-exclusive miniseries Kamen Sentai Gorider, Kuroto arranges the resurrection of Kujo, among other deceased Riders, to lure Emu Hojo to the Game World and kill him. However, Kazuma Kenzaki arrives to help Emu and the revived Riders stop Kuroto. During the fight, Kujo transforms into the yellow-colored  before joining the fallen Riders in sacrificing themselves to defeat Kuroto and ensure Emu and Kenzaki's escape.

Amidst the Kamen Rider Chronicle crisis, Masamune Dan revives Kujo as a Bugster to serve him. However, the latter secretly works against him before eventually rejoining the Gamer Riders to stop Masamune. Following this, Kujo is nominated to become an official member of CR and collaborates with Tsukuru Koboshi to develop Bugster Virus vaccines.

During the events of the V-Cinema Kamen Rider Ex-Aid Trilogy: Another Ending, a dying Masamune tasks Kujo with foiling Kuroto's plot to destroy the universe and nearly dies again, though Hiiro Kagami is able to revive Kujo and restore his humanity.

Prior to his revival in the series, Kiriya's death had become a popular hashtag in Japan's Twitter feed under the slogan, based on the advertising slogan of the animated film Grave of the Fireflies. Toei Company took note of this and quickly issued an apology.

Utilizing a Gamer Driver in conjunction with the racing game-themed  Gashat, Kujo can transform into   Level 1. In this form, he wields the  knuckleduster and the  gun, can perform spin attacks, and transform further into his motorcycle-like Bike Gamer Level 2 form. Additionally, activating Bakusou Bike generates a Game Area and Energy Items randomly hidden inside trophy stand-like containers. While he is capable of moving in his Level 2 form and switching back to his Level 1 form on his own, he requires a partner to help him activate his finishers. Moreover, he can combine Bakusou Bike with additional Gashats to achieve stronger forms, which are as follows: 
: A humanoid form accessed from the Bakusou Bike and Drago Knight Hunter Z Gashats alongside one to three other Gamer Riders that equips him with the Drago Knight Blade and Gun.

After being revived by Masamune, Kujo utilizes the Gamer Driver and Bakusou Bike Gashat to transform into the humanoid  Bike Gamer . In this form, he gains the ability to nullify the Bugster Virus and wield the Gashacon Sparrow so long as he is in possession of Giri Giri Chambara. Additionally, Kujo can combine Bakusou Bike with beta test-themed Proto-Gashats to achieve the following forms:
 Level 0: A form accessed from Bakusou Bike and  that arms him with the Trick Flywheels.
 Level 0: A form accessed from Bakusou Bike and  that equips him with the Air Force Winger and the Gatling Combats.

During the events of the V-Cinema Kamen Rider Ex-Aid Trilogy: Another Ending, Kujo utilizes the Buggle Driver II and Giri Giri Chambara Gashat to transform into . While transformed, he can perform the Critical Crews-Aid finisher.

Masamune Dan
 is the original CEO of Genm Corp., the husband of Sakurako, and the father of Kuroto who orchestrated his son's schemes in an attempt to revive his wife after she had been infected with the Bugster Virus. Six years prior to the series, Masamune participated in Emu Hojo's life-saving surgery. Developing a god complex before secretly infecting himself with the Bugster Virus, allowing Kuroto to frame him for Zero Day, and willingly going to prison to incubate his virus in peace.

After being cleared of all charges and Kuroto and the Bugsters complete Kamen Rider Chronicle in the present, Masamune reclaims his position as Genm Corp.'s CEO and commercially releases the game so he can mass-produce its Gashats, release them worldwide, and turn its players into data. To further his plans, he also reprograms Kamen Rider Chronicles final boss, Gamedeus, to obey him. When CR develop the means to defeat Gamedeus and end Kamen Rider Chronicle, Masamune absorbs the Bugster, transforms into , and causes a citywide epidemic, but Poppy Pipopapo and Parad sacrifice themselves to extract Gamedeus from Masamune and allow the Gamer Riders to defeat them. Despite this, Masamune commits suicide by subjecting himself to the Kamen Rider Chronicle Master Gashat's virus, taking it with him to prevent the Riders from freeing the game's victims.

In the V-Cinema, Kamen Rider Ex-Aid Trilogy: Another Ending, Kuroto revives Masamune to force him to help the former develop Zombie Chronicle in order to destroy the universe and serve as a host for Black Parad. Masamune later frees himself and attempts to stop Kuroto, but is fatally wounded in battle against his son. Before he dies, Masamune tells Kiriya Kujo the truth of how the former and Kuroto were driven to madness before giving Kujo his Buggle Driver II.

During the events of the two-part web-exclusive special Kamen Rider Gemn: The Presidents, after an artificial intelligence called the Ark revives Kuroto, who infects ZAIA Enterprise CEO Gai Amatsu with the Bugster Virus, Masamune emerges from Amatsu as a Bugster and fights Kuroto to stop him from using Gemn Corp. for malicious intent. However, Amatsu convinces the Dans to reconcile and the pair return to the digital world in peace.

Utilizing the Buggle Driver II and the Kamen Rider Chronicle Master Gashat, Masamune can transform into  . While transformed, he possesses chronokinesis via his  and  abilities and wields the Gashacon Bugvisor II. Additionally, his Master Gashat allows him to manipulate Bugsters' lives and control Ride-Player casualties.

As Gamedeus Cronus, he wields Gamedeus' DeuSlasher and Deus Rampart and can transform into the Bugster's  form, which possesses the extendable  arms and the sword-like  leg.

Recurring characters

Seito University Hospital
CR was formed five years prior to the series during , before the Bugster infection was made public.

To combat the Bugsters, CR developed  belts and  cartridges from technology provided by Gemn Corp. to allow doctors who have been immunized against the Bugster Virus to transform into Kamen Riders. While transformed, they all wield multiform  unique to them, which allows them to perform  finishers, start out in chibi-esque  forms before they can upgrade into their sleeker  forms, change locations via the  function, and perform  finishers via the  attachment.

Haima Kagami
 is Hiiro's father and the director of the hospital who is in charge of CR.

Kyotaro Hinata
 is the Deputy Director-General of the Ministry of Health and a former doctor. Sixteen years prior to the series, he performed a life-saving surgery on Emu Hojo.

Bugsters
After Kuroto Dan discovered them during the millennium turnover, his father Masamune infected himself with the original Bugster Virus before he manipulated Kuroto into doing the same to Emu Hojo in order to breed the Bugsters themselves.

Following Zero Day, the Bugsters are developed from humans infected with the Bugster Virus. Using their host's negative emotions, the monsters are able to take control of them and transform them into giant  monsters. Unless their corresponding Bugster is destroyed or dealt with quickly, the host will turn into data and the former fully manifests with additional powers, such as the ability to assume human forms. Due to negative emotions fueling the Bugster Virus and Game Disease, stressors can potentially cause the host to spawn additional Bugster Virus foot soldiers or duplicates of the original Bugster monster. If a Bugster's physical body is destroyed without someone absorbing their essence, they will die permanently, though fully manifested Bugsters possess immortality and can be revived multiple times. Despite all of this, a person afflicted with the Bugster Virus or Game Disease can overcome their condition via positive emotions.

After Graphite attempts to cause a second Zero Day, the Bugsters evolve to the point where they can attain their monstrous forms without assuming Bugster Union forms, retain memories from past battles, "level up" along with the Gamer Riders, take over their host's body by killing their mind, and eventually, the ability to manifest without a host.

Being born from video games, the Bugsters behave similarly to artificial intelligences and follow their corresponding games' rules. As such, some take on an antagonistic role and fight their hosts while others behave like support characters and aid their hosts. Regardless of whether they are in opposition or cooperation with each other, they all follow the rules and treat each other fairly.

Graphite
The , or simply , is a draconic warrior-themed leading Bugster who was born from the Drago Knight Hunter Z Gashat's data and Saki Momose five years prior to the series. Due to her death, Graphite formed a rivalry with her boyfriend Hiiro Kagami and Taiga Hanaya, the doctor who failed to save her.

In the present, Graphite emerges to monitor Bugster Virus infection rates and battle the Gamer Riders. After losing face with Kuroto Dan, Graphite steals the Proto Drago Knight Hunter Z Gashat to evolve himself and attempts to spread the Bugster Virus on a larger scale, only to be defeated by Hiiro, Hanaya, Emu Hojo, and Kiriya Kujo. A year later, Parad resurrects Graphite and evolves him further so he can help the Bugsters use Kamen Rider Chronicle to replace humanity with more of their kind. When Masamune Dan takes over Kamen Rider Chronicle for himself, Graphite obtains a sample of the game's final boss, Gamedeus, and infects himself with it to cultivate the virus. Graphite eventually faces Hiiro and Hanaya in a final battle amidst Masamune's attempts to keep him alive and prolong Kamen Rider Chronicle and allowing Nico Saiba to defeat him as she had earned the right to do so while playing Kamen Rider Chronicle. Before he dies, Graphite thanks his allies and enemies for allowing him to fulfill his role as a game character.

He initially starts the series in a green-colored form via the Gashacon Bugvisor, which allows him to switch between his human and Bugster forms and infect people with the Bugster Virus. As the series progresses, he evolves into the following forms:
: A black-colored form that Graphite achieved through the beta test-themed  Gashat after Kuroto revoked his Bugvisor. In this form, he possesses increased power and the ability to perform the  finisher.
After exposing himself to Gamedeus' Bugster Virus, Graphite gains immunity to Kamen Rider Cronus' chronokinetic powers.

Lovrica
He brainwashes Poppy Pipopapo to assist them further, but Masamune negates Lovrica's powers and kills him.

During the events of the V-Cinema, Kamen Rider Ex-Aid Trilogy: Another Ending, Lovrica is revived amidst CR's attempts to revive Bugster Virus victims and infects an American gamer named . After manipulating a similarly revived Saki Momose however, Lovrica is killed once more by Kamen Riders Snipe and Brave.

In addition to the standard Bugster abilities, Lovrica can alter other Bugsters' minds and breathe fire in his human form. In his Bugster form, he can create Bugster Virus groupies called  to support him and possesses immunity against conventional attacks due to Toki Meki Crisis lacking a combat mechanic. Despite this, he becomes vulnerable if he is rejected by the woman or women he is flirting with or his Lovely Girls are deleted. In both forms, he wields the Gashacon Bugvisor, which he can use to switch between his two forms and infect people with the Bugster Virus.

In his initial cameo as Amagasaki, Lovrica is portrayed by an unidentified stand-in.

Gamedeus
The , or simply , is the final boss of Kamen Rider Chronicle who only appears once all of the game's  are collected and is reputed to be so powerful that only Kamen Rider Cronus can defeat him. Masamune Dan reprograms Gamedeus to spread the Bugster Virus across Japan, but the former's son Kuroto Dan and Kiriya Kujo create the Doctor Mighty XX Gashat to negate Gamedeus' effects via an antivirus. In response, Masamune merges with the Bugster to become Gamedeus Cronus, only for the latter to be freed by Poppy Pipopapo and destroyed by Parad.

In addition to the standard Bugster abilities, Gamedeus possesses all of the other Bugsters' powers and is armed with the  sword and the  shield.

Minor Bugsters
: A Bugster born from the Mighty Action X Gashat's data who is armed with the  gauntlet. He infects Emu Hojo's patient  and manifests in his Level 1 form before Salty is destroyed by Kamen Rider Ex-Aid. Salty later returns in his Level 3 form after infecting eight-year old , only to be destroyed once more by Kamen Riders Ex-Aid and Brave and Poppy before Parad absorbs Salty's essence into a Gashacon Bugvisor. Amidst the Kamen Rider Chronicle crisis, Salty returns in his Level 10 form as part of the game, only to be destroyed by Brave and Ride-Player Nico and later permanently deleted by Masamune Dan.
He infects  before manifesting in his Level 1 form and attempts to kidnap Natori's fiancé, only to be destroyed by Kamen Riders Ex-Aid and Brave. After infecting , a surgeon who is dying of cancer, Alhambra manifests in his Level 10 form to take revenge on Brave, only to be destroyed by Ex-Aid before Kamen Rider Gemn downloads the Bugster's essence into a Gashacon Bugvisor. Amidst the Kamen Rider Chronicle crisis, Alhambra returns in his Level 50 form, but is destroyed by Ride-Player Nico.
: A Bugster born from the Bang Bang Shooting Gashat who is equipped with the right arm-mounted  machine gun and can produce clones of and camouflage himself. He infects  before manifesting in his Level 1 form to act on the latter's fear of doctors by killing them, only to be destroyed by Kamen Rider Snipe. After Nico Saiba steals Snipe's Rider equipment to fight Ex-Aid, unaware of its requirements, she becomes infected by Revol, who immediately manifests in his Level 5 form. Due to him fighting the Riders and Bugsters alike while acting on Nico's desire, Kamen Rider Para-DX destroys Revol before Kamen Rider Gemn downloads his essence into a Gashacon Bugvisor. Revol briefly returns amidst the Kamen Rider Chronicle crisis, but is destroyed by Ride-Player Nico.
: A Bugster born from the Bakusou Bike Gashat who possesses the  motorcycle. He infects  and manifests in his Level 1 form, but is destroyed by Kamen Rider Gemn to impede Kamen Rider Lazer's investigation into the Bugsters. Gemn later infects Tsukuru Koboshi with Motors, who manifests in his Level 5 form to attack Gemn Corp. employees who support Koboshi and accelerate Ex-Aid's Game Disease. With his task complete, Gemn destroys Motors. Motors later infects rock musician  and manifests in his Level 20 form, only to be destroyed by Kamen Rider Ex-Aid. Motors briefly returns during the Kamen Rider Chronicle crisis, but is destroyed by Kamen Rider Brave.
: A series of Bugsters born from Armor-type Gashats, which they house in a slot on their heads to acquire armor and weaponry.
The first Collabos Bugster infects music college student  and uses the Gekitotsu Robots Gashat to equip himself with the  gauntlet after manifesting. He is destroyed by Kamen Rider Ex-Aid, who retrieves the Gashat for his own use.
The second Collabos Bugster also infects and manifests from Horiuchi before using the DoReMiFa Beat Gashat to equip himself with the shoulder-mounted  speakers. He is destroyed by Kamen Rider Brave, who retrieves the Gashat for his own use.
The third Collabos Bugster infects restricted elderly parent,  before manifesting and using the Giri Giri Chambara Gashat to arm himself with the  katana and gain expert swordsmanship capabilities. He is destroyed by Kamen Riders Ex-Aid and Lazer, who retrieve the Gashat for the latter's use.
The fourth Collabos Bugster also infects and manifests from Okada before using the Jet Combat Gashat to equip himself with the  jetpack. After defeating him and retrieving the Gashat for his own use, Kamen Rider Snipe uses the weakened Collabos Bugster as bait to lure in Kamen Riders Ex-Aid and Brave before destroying the Bugster while attempting to kill the former.
During the events of the Kamen Rider Gemn web-exclusive series, the titular character summons a fifth Collabos Bugster and has them use the Proto Gekitotsu Robots and Proto Giri Giri Chambara Gashats to transform into the Robol and Giril Bugster respectively to collect data on legendary Kamen Riders. After Kamen Rider Ex-Aid defeats it twice, Gemn uses the Bugster to summon digital copies of Kamen Riders W, OOO, and Fourze to fight Ex-Aid, though he is able to overcome them and destroy the Bugster.
: A Bugster born from the Ju Ju Burger Gashat's data. Despite infecting the game's creator, Tsukuru Koboshi, Burgermon proves friendly and harmless so long as he is fed large quantities of burgers. After Kamen Rider Ex-Aid satisfies Burgermon's appetite, Koboshi's Game Disease subsides. However, Kamen Rider Gemn attacks Koboshi for using his personal terminals, leading to Burgermon sacrificing himself to save the latter. After Koboshi becomes the CEO of Gemn Corp., he posthumously makes Burgermon a company mascot.
: A Bugster born from the Gekitotsu Robots Gashat who is armed with the  gauntlet. He infects a buyō dancer named  before manifesting around her in his Level 30 form, only to be separated from his host and destroyed by Kamen Rider Brave. Gatton briefly returns amidst the Kamen Rider Chronicle crisis, but is destroyed by Ride-Player Nico.
: A Bugster born from the Jet Combat Gashat's data who is armed with the  jetpack. He infects acrophobic high school student  before manifesting around him in his Level 30 form, only to be separated from his host and destroyed by Kamen Rider Snipe. Vernier later infects a rock musician named  and manifests around him in his Level 40 form before he is separated from his host once more and destroyed by Kamen Rider Brave. Vernier briefly returns amidst the Kamen Rider Chronicle crisis, but is destroyed by Snipe and Ride-Player Nico.
He infects a stubborn detective named  before manifesting around him in his Level 30 form, only to be separated from his host and destroyed by Kamen Rider Brave. Kaiden later infects a rock musician named  and manifests around him in his Level 40 form, but is separated from his host once more and destroyed by Kamen Rider Snipe. Kaiden briefly returns amidst the Kamen Rider Chronicle in his Level 60 form, but is destroyed by Kamen Rider Ex-Aid.
: A Bugster born from the Shakariki Sports Gashat's data who possesses the  bicycle and built-in springs that grant enhanced agility. To escape police custody, Kuroto Dan infects himself with Charlie, who manifests around the former in his Level 30 form before being separated from his host and destroyed by Kamen Rider Ex-Aid. Charlie briefly returns amidst the Kamen Rider Chronicle crisis, but is destroyed by Ride-Player Nico.

Saki Momose
 is a deceased medical student at Seito University and Hiiro Kagami's girlfriend. Five years prior to the series, Kuroto Dan secretly infected her with the Bugster Virus and provoked her into worsening her condition, which she kept secret from Hiiro so as not to distract him from his work and due to him treating her coldly. Taiga Hanaya attempted to save her, but due to being weakened from his use of a Proto Gashat, he was unable to save her nor stop the emerging Graphite. Before she died and turned into data stored in the Proto Drago Knight Hunter Z Gashat, she asked Hiiro to become the greatest doctor in the world.

In the present, Masamune Dan steals the Proto Gashats from the Ministry of Health and bribes Hiiro into helping him maintain Kamen Rider Chronicle by promising to restore Momose. After the former threatens to delete her data unless the latter willfully botches a surgery meant to save Hanaya however, Hiiro chooses to maintain his integrity as a doctor and refuses, leading to Masamune seemingly deleting Momose's data.

During the events of the V-Cinema Kamen Rider Ex-Aid Trilogy: Another Ending, Kuroto temporarily resurrects Momose, but a similarly revived Lovrica subsequently brainwashes her. Hiiro and Hanaya succeed in defeating the Bugster and freeing her, only to learn of what Kuroto did. Despite this, Momose tells Hiiro she had forgiven him for how he treated her and gives him the strength to come to terms with her death before she dies once more.

Nico Saiba
, also known by her gaming tag "N", is a young tomboy and professional fighting game player who holds a grudge against Emu Hojo for defeating her in a Tekken tournament six years prior to the series. In pursuit of getting revenge on him, she appears before and latches onto Taiga Hanaya, much to his annoyance. Amidst the Kamen Rider Chronicle crisis, Saiba becomes  to clear the game using her gaming strategies and discovers Emu's Bugster Parad is her real rival. After being nearly killed by the crisis' mastermind Masamune Dan however, she resumes her high school education, graduates, and goes on to become Hanaya's assistant.

Tsukuru Koboshi
 is a video game developer for Gemn Corp.'s development team who spent five years developing the Rider Gashats. Following the apparent death of company CEO, Kuroto Dan, and Gemn Corp. suffering financial problems, Koboshi attempts to keep the company afloat by developing a new game called Ju Ju Burger. With support from his coworkers on the development team and the new CEO, Ren Amagasaki, they complete the game using Kuroto's private terminals, though Koboshi is infected with the Bugster Virus. The Burgermon Bugster emerges from Koboshi as a result, but he embraces it as a friend after seeing the monster is based on one of Ju Ju Burgers characters. When Burgermon inadvertently causes panic outside Gemn Corp. Koboshi and Emu Hojo intervene, but Kuroto kills Burgermon and confiscates the Ju Ju Burger Gashat in retaliation for someone creating a game without his permission. While mourning Burgermon, Koboshi is recruited by Taiga Hanaya to develop the Maximum Mighty X Gashat so Emu can defeat Kuroto. Following this, Koboshi eventually becomes the new CEO of Gemn Corp. and posthumously makes Burgermon a company mascot.

Ride-Players
The  are civilians infected with the Bugster Virus who transform using mass-produced Kamen Rider Chronicle Gashats and initially wield , which function as a dagger and gun, until they steal the Gamer Riders' Gashats to access the corresponding Gashacon Weapon. As participants of the Kamen Rider Chronicle event however, defeated players face the risk of being turned into data saved on Proto Gashats and fueling the Bugsters' plot to eliminate humanity or dying from the Bugster Virus if they quit the event without having defeated an opponent.

Guest characters
 and : Nurses who work as assistants to Hiiro Kagami at Seito University Hospital after he saved their lives following an accident.
: An interstellar traveler with incredible luck and field leader of the Kyurangers who is capable of transforming into . He briefly arrives on Earth to help the Gamer Riders rescue Bugster Virus victims. Lucky and his fellow Kyurangers would later join forces with the Gamer Riders again to defeat the terrorist organization Shocker during the events of the crossover film Kamen Rider × Super Sentai: Ultra Super Hero Taisen.
: A genius yet amnesiac scientist from an alternate universe who can transform into  and was originally the "demon scientist"  before he became involved in an alien conspiracy and had his memories and face altered. In episode 44 of the series and the film Kamen Rider Ex-Aid the Movie: True Ending, Katsuragi traveled to Emu Hojo's universe to steal his Rider powers in the hopes of stopping Kaisei Mogami from destroying both of their universes. Two years later, after becoming Kiryu and during the events of the crossover film Kamen Rider Heisei Generations Final: Build & Ex-Aid with Legend Rider, he temporarily uses Emu's powers to battle Mogami's Nebula Bugsters before he is confronted by Parad. Kiryu eventually returns Emu's powers to him before joining forces with him and both of their allies to stop Mogami.

Spin-off exclusive characters

Next Genome Institute
Six years prior to the series, the group was approached by Kuroto Dan to extract the Bugster Virus from Emu Hojo's body. However, this resulted in the creation of Parad while the scientists were infected with Game Disease, sent to the Game World to be reborn as Bugsters, and presumed missing. The group resurfaces in the crossover film Kamen Rider Heisei Generations: Dr. Pac-Man vs. Ex-Aid & Ghost with Legend Rider to steal the Proto-Gashats from a compliant Kuroto in order to create the ultimate life form.

Michihiko Zaizen
 is an authority on gene therapy and the director of the Next Genome Institute. Once he captures Tōgo Kiyomiya, Zaizen splices the youth's Bugster strain with his digitized DNA to transform into the ultimate lifeform, before attempting to turn Tōgo into another Genomes, intending to repeat the process and turn all humans into disease-resistant beings. However, he is killed by Kamen Rider Ex-Aid.

Sōji Kuruse
He is defeated by Kamen Rider Drive.

Kazushige Ryūzaki
He is defeated by Kamen Rider Wizard.

Ageha Takeda
She is defeated by Kamen Rider Gaim.

Tōgo Kiyomiya
 is a high school student and computer programming prodigy who developed the  video game and appears exclusively in the crossover film Kamen Rider Heisei Generations: Dr. Pac-Man vs. Ex-Aid & Ghost with Legend Rider. Due to his being a carrier of a new strain of the Bugster Virus, the Next Genome Institute kidnap Kiyomiya, but the latter is rescued by Kamen Riders Ex-Aid, Ghost, Drive, Gaim, and Wizard.

Hatena
First appearing in the crossover film Kamen Rider Heisei Generations: Dr. Pac-Man vs. Ex-Aid & Ghost with Legend Rider, he infects and manifests from Tōgo Kiyomiya before he is killed by Kamen Rider Ghost.

In the Kamen Rider Para-DX Hyper Battle DVD special, Kuroto Dan recreates the Hatena Bugster to serve as a boss for his adventure game, . However, the latter is killed by Kamen Riders Ex-Aid and Para-DX.

Foundation X researcher
An unidentified Foundation X researcher who appears exclusively in the web-exclusive special Kamen Rider Brave: Survive! The Revived Beast Rider Squad. He visits the Seito University Hospital to secretly provide them the Night of Safari Gashat in order to see how Emu Hojo would use its power. While Hiiro Kagami ends up finding and using it instead, the researcher eventually recovers the Gashat and deems the experiment a success before contacting his superiors to begin conducting research into other Gashats.

The Foundation X researcher is portrayed by suit actor .

Another Hiiro
 is a version of Hiiro Kagami born from the latter's guilt over failing to save Eito Kirino capable of traveling back and forth between the world of the Ultra Super Hero Taisen video game and the real world who appears exclusively in the crossover film Kamen Rider × Super Sentai: Ultra Super Hero Taisen.

Utilizing a Gamer Driver and the Japanese role-playing game-themed  Gashat, Another Hiiro can transform into   Level 50. While transformed, he wields the  flame-bladed sword.

Like the original Hiiro Kagami, Another Hiiro is also portrayed by Toshiki Seto.

Eito Kirino
 is a closed-minded boy and programming prodigy who appears exclusively in the crossover film Kamen Rider × Super Sentai: Ultra Super Hero Taisen. Born without emotions, he was infected with a disease that slowly digitized him and came into Hiiro Kagami's care, but died after refusing to allow Hiiro to operate on him. Failing to see anything beautiful about the real world, Kirino created the Ultra Super Hero Taisen video game in order to destroy it. Through Hiiro, Emu Hojo, Poppy Pipopapo, and the similarly emotionless Naga Ray's efforts however, Kirino is able to experience emotions and smile for the first time.

Shocker Leader III
After being defeated off-screen by past Kamen Riders, he takes refuge in the Game World before resurfacing in the present as a boss for the Ultra Super Hero Taisen video game's  bonus stage. He is defeated by an enlarged Kamen Rider Ex-Aid and two duplicates of the Kyurangers' mecha Kyurenoh.

Goriders
 is a Kamen Rider/Super Sentai hybrid team who appear in the crossover film Kamen Rider × Super Sentai: Ultra Super Hero Taisen and a self-titled web-exclusive miniseries. Consisting of the red-colored , the blue-colored , the yellow-colored , the pink-colored  and the green-colored , the team incorporates traits from the first Sentai, Himitsu Sentai Gorenger, and Kamen Riders 1 and 2 from the original Kamen Rider television series and transform via Gorider cards.

In Ultra Super Hero Taisen, Emu Hojo, Yakumo Kato, Masato Jin, Momotaros, and Shuichi Kitaoka become Akarider, Aorider, Kirider, Momorider, and Midorider respectively upon winning the Ultra Super Hero Taisen tournament.

In the Kamen Sentai Gorider miniseries, Emu transforms Kaito Kumon, Kazuma Kenzaki, Kiriya Kujo, Yoko Minato, and Kaoru Kino into Akarider, Aorider, Kirider, Momorider, and Midorider respectively to assist him in defeating a backup copy of Kuroto Dan and his monstrous ally Totema.

Totema
 is a mysterious monster who appears in the web-exclusive miniseries Kamen Sentai Gorider. He was developed by Kuroto Dan to serve as the invincible final boss for his unbeatable game, as well as lure in five deceased Kamen Riders so Kuroto can use them to revive himself. Despite possessing the ability to reconstruct himself if he is destroyed, Totema is destroyed by Kamen Rider Ex-Aid and Kamen Sentai Gorider.

Totema is voiced by  while Ruka Matsuda, who also portrays Poppy Pipopapo, portrays his maid NPC disguise.

Machina Vision
 is a foreign video game company that develops advanced VR technology and cooperated with Genm Corp. in the distribution of Kamen Rider Chronicle in exchange for a Gamer Driver from Masamune Dan. However, their deal fell through after Masamune discovered Machina Vision CEO Johnny Maxima had no intention of upholding his end. A year after Masamune's death, Machina Vision hacks Genm Corp.'s servers to steal data on the Gamer Driver and Rider Gashats.

Kagenari Nagumo
 is a Machina Vision executive who seeks to integrate humanity with virtual reality to create an "eternal heaven" for his daughter Madoka Hoshi and appears exclusively in the film Kamen Rider Ex-Aid the Movie: True Ending. To achieve his goal, he infects people with a new type of virus to trap their consciousnesses in a virtual reality world and attempts to destroy the real world. After being foiled by Kamen Rider Ex-Aid and his allies, Nagumo chooses to stay in the VR world with Madoka.

Utilizing a Gamer Driver and the stealth game-themed  Gashat, Nagumo can transform into  .

Ninja-Players
The  are Nagumo's henchmen consisting of individuals that he infected who appear exclusively in the film Kamen Rider Ex-Aid the Movie: True Ending. Similarly to the Ride-Players and Nagumo, they all wield a short ninjatō called  and virus-loaded energy shurikens respectively.

Johnny Maxima
 is the mysterious CEO of Machina Vision who aligned himself with Masamune Dan amidst the Kamen Rider Chronicle crisis. After stealing Graphite's Gashacon Bugvisor near the end of the crisis during the series, Maxima returns in the film Kamen Rider Ex-Aid the Movie: True Ending to assist his employee Kagenari Nagumo. In the process, Maxima infects himself with the Gamedeus virus and absorbs three Gashatrophies that Madoka Hoshi created to transform into , only to be defeated by Kamen Rider Ex-Aid.

As Gamedeus Machina, he can utilize the Bugster's abilities and wields the  sword and the  shield. Additionally, he can transform into the gigantic , a form that possesses the extendable  arms and the sword-like  leg.

Madoka Hoshi
 is a 7-year-old girl who requires daily treatments for her brain tumor, was transferred to the Seito University Hospital's care, and appears exclusively in the film Kamen Rider Ex-Aid the Movie: True Ending. Her father, Kagenari Nagumo, intends to save her by infecting her with the Gamedeus virus in order to transfer her consciousness to a virtual reality world in cyberspace. Despite Kamen Rider Ex-Aid's attempts to save her, she chooses to stay in the VR world with her father.

Akemi Hoshi
 is Madoka's mother and Kagenari Nagumo's ex-wife who raised the former on her own.

Nebula Bugsters
The  are Bugster/Smash hybrids that Kaisei Mogami created using Bugster Virus and liquid Nebula Gas samples.

Luke Kidman
 is an American esports professional who appears exclusively in the V-Cinema, Kamen Rider Ex-Aid Trilogy: Another Ending. He sees Nico Saiba as a rival despite being a fan of her.

Black Parad
Upon Black Parad's creation, Kuroto has Saiko Yaotome reprogram the former to support him in acquiring human DNA and stopping CR from reviving Bugster Virus victims by replacing the original Parad. After fighting the original Parad, Black Parad is absorbed by Kuroto, who uses him to create the God Maximum Mighty X Gashat.

Utilizing a Gamer Driver and the double-sized , Black Parad can transform into  .

Like the original Parad, Black Parad is portrayed by Shouma Kai.

Saiko Yaotome
 is a researcher of the Seito University Hospital's Regenerative Medicine Center, an authority on gene therapy, and the daughter of Michihiko Zaizen who researches methods for reviving Bugster Virus victims and appears exclusively in the V-Cinema, Kamen Rider Ex-Aid Trilogy: Another Ending. Using the  belt and its built-in life simulation game , she intends to continue her father's work and avenge his death by working with Kuroto Dan to kill Bugsters in order to revive Bugster Virus victims. Upon learning Kuroto had used her however, she experiences remorse and helps the Gamer Riders develop a cure for Kuroto's victims during his attempt to destroy the universe and contribute to restoring Kiriya Kujo's humanity.

Kiyonaga Hojo
 is Emu's father, the former president of a medical equipment manufacturing company, and the accidental creator of the Bugster Virus who appears exclusively in the Kamen Rider Ex-Aid tie-in novel, Mighty Novel X. Kiyonaga attempted to counteract the Bugster Virus before the Year 2000 problem, but Masamune Dan discovered his secrets and blackmailed him into turning Emu into a carrier for the virus. As a result, a guilt-ridden Kiyonaga severed all ties with his family. Following the events of Kamen Rider Ex-Aid Trilogy: Another Ending, Kiyonaga resurfaces as Kamen Rider Gemn to face and apologize to Emu as part of Kuroto Dan's Mighty Novel X game before Kuroto kills him.

Notes

References

External links
Cast on TV Asahi

Ex-Aid
Kamen Rider Ex-Aid